The Meratus Dayak inhabit the Meratus Mountains of South Kalimantan, Indonesia. The Banjar Kuala people would refer the Meratus people as Urang Baiju or Dayak Baiju, as they consider them to be the same as the Ngaju people. While the Banjar Hulu Sungai people would call the Meratus people as Urang Bukit, Dayak Bukit or Dayak Buguet.

Naming
A Meratus Dayak's name changes over the course of his or her life. Children have "body names" (ngaran badan) that are not usually used after adolescence. When they have children, men and women acquire teknonyms (ngaran ba'anak). For a man this name is Ma X or Pa'an X, where X is the name of one of his children, or sometimes another word. For a woman it is Induan X or Dun X, depending on which part of the Meratus area she lives in. Older men become Awat X (grandfather of X) and older women become Apih X.

Language
Local Meratus Dayak dialects are closely related linguistically to both Indonesian (the national language), and to the Banjar language. Most Meratus Dayak can speak Banjar and Indonesian since government administrators conduct business in Indonesian and trade with the Banjar people is conducted in Banjar.

Sub-ethnics
The Meratus people are divided into several sub-ethnics including:-
 Dayak Pitap people
 Dayak Alai people
 Dayak Labuhan people
 Dayak Atiran people
 Dayak Kiyu people
 Dayak Juhu people
 Dayak Hantakan (Dayak Bukit) people
 Dayak Labuan Amas people
 Dayak Loksado (Dayak Amandit) people
 Dayak Harakit (Dayak Tapin) people
 Dayak Paramasan people
 Dayak Kayu Tangi people
 Dayak Bangkalaan people
 Dayak Sampanahan people
 Dayak Riam Adungan people
 Dayak Bajuin people
 Dayak Sembamban Baru people
 and many more

Culture

Dance
 Gintur Dadas dance, a ritualistic dance practiced by the Dayak Meratus Halong people to summon ancestral spirits.
 Batandik, a dance performed to summon ancestral spirits during the Aruh Baharin ritual.

Rituals
 Aruh Baharin, a ritual also practiced by the Buddhist majority Dayak Balanghan people to close the paddy farming season after the completion of harvesting the field.

Economy
Meratus Dayak are primarily farmers, and rice is the main crop. Rice cultivation occurs in swiddens (cleared portions of the forest). Swiddens are usually cultivated for a few years, then the forest is allowed to regenerate when the farmers move to a different swidden location to farm. The farmers may return to a swidden, although there is usually at least 15 years between leaving and returning to a swidden.

Meratus people also collect forest products and trade with Banjar at markets outside the mountains. In these transactions Banjar typically act as middle men between the Meratus and other traders.

Social organization
Most Meratus live and farm in umbun which are also considered the primary social units among the Meratus Dayak. Umbun are founded by a man and a woman, usually a married couple, but sometimes also a brother and sister, a widow and her adult son, or other male-female pairs. Umbun also embrace a variety of dependents who have not yet founded their own umbun, including children and recently married, disabled, and widowed adults. The founding pair is responsible for the umbun.
Some Meratus have also been moved into villages by government resettlement programs. The Meratus are classified as a "semi-nomadic" isolated tribe, and are the target of government development programs as such.

References

Further reading
 

Ethnic groups in Indonesia
Hindu ethnic groups
Dayak people